Peter Wilkinson Howitt (born May 31, 1946) is a Canadian economist. He is the Lyn Crost Professor of Social Sciences at Brown University. Howitt is a Fellow of the Econometric Society since 1994 and a Fellow of Royal Society of Canada since 1992. He served as president of the Canadian Economics Association in 1993–1994 and was the editor of the Journal of Money, Credit, and Banking in the period 1997–2000. For 2019 he received the BBVA Foundation Frontiers of Knowledge Award in Economics.

Academic career 

Howitt received his BA in economics from McGill University, afterward, gaining his Master's in economics from the University of Western Ontario. Howitt finally obtained his Ph.D. in Economics from Northwestern University.

Selected works

Books

Papers

References

External sources
 Academic CV
 Innovation, Competition and Growth: A Schumpeterian Perspective on Canada's Economy
 

1946 births
Living people
Canadian economists
Fellows of the Econometric Society
Fellows of the Royal Society of Canada
McGill University alumni
University of Western Ontario alumni
Northwestern University alumni
Brown University faculty